Claude Benton Hudspeth (May 12, 1877 – March 19, 1941) was an American cowboy, rancher, and lawyer from El Paso, Texas.

Biography 
A native of Medina, he represented Texas as a Democrat in the U.S. Congress from 1919 to 1931.  He also served in the Texas House of Representatives and in the Texas State Senate.

Hudspeth moved to San Antonio in 1940, and died there on March 19, 1941. He is buried in the Mission Burial Park in San Antonio. Hudspeth County, Texas was named for him after he supported its creation in the state senate.

External links 
 
 Martin Donell Kohout: 

1877 births
1941 deaths
Politicians from El Paso, Texas
Democratic Party Texas state senators
People from Bandera County, Texas
Democratic Party members of the Texas House of Representatives
American cattlemen
Democratic Party members of the United States House of Representatives from Texas